Whitwell is a village and civil parish in the Hambleton District of North Yorkshire, England. Details are included in the civil parish of Great Langton.

History

The etymology of the name is derived from a combination of the Old English word hwit, meaning white or infertile and the Anglian suffix of wella, meaning spring or stream. Put together they mean White spring or stream. It has also been known as Nether Whitwell in the Whins.

The manor was a part of the estates of William the Conqueror and later his maternal half-sibling, Robert, Count of Mortain, but the lands were transferred by escheat to Walter Espec of Helmsley who founded Kirkham priory in 1122. The manor was part of the fee of the Constables whose manor was at Constable Burton and followed that descent. Around 1240 a mesne lordship was granted to Jollan de Nevill. Other landowners included the Staveley family who claimed land in 1272, though the major landowner were the Whitwell family. At the end of the 17th century, the manor was in the hands of John Belasyse of Worlaby, whose heirs owned a quarter share of the manor thereafter.

Governance

The village lies within the Richmond UK Parliament constituency. It also lies within the Swale electoral division of North Yorkshire County Council and the Morton-on-Swale ward of Hambleton District Council.

Geography

Whitwell consists of little more than a few houses and a farm. The nearest notable settlements are Scorton and North Cowton.

Demography

References

External links

Villages in North Yorkshire
Civil parishes in North Yorkshire
Hambleton District